The Loughborough Building Society is a UK-based financial services provider headquartered in Loughborough, Leicestershire.  In 2014 it had reported assets of about £287 million.

The Society was founded by local businessmen, in 1867, as one of the new 19th century ‘permanent’ building societies. Unlike the original building society model, which had arisen in the English Midlands in the 1770s, these new societies were open to new members on an ongoing basis and not intended to terminate once each original member had purchased a house.

It is one of the five building societies based in Leicestershire. Earl Shilton, Hinckley & Rugby, Loughborough, Market Harborough, Melton.

Currently the Society maintains three branches of its own, in the town of Loughborough, in Derby and in Long Eaton, Notts., and it operates via agencies in West Bridgford and Southwell.

External links
Loughborough Building Society
KPMG Building Societies Database 2008

Building societies of England
Banks established in 1867
Organizations established in 1867
Companies based in Loughborough
1867 establishments in England